Anita Yadav (born 20 April 1964) is an Indian politician from Indian National Congress who is a Member of Haryana Legislative Assembly and a former Minister representing the Ateli (Mahendergarh) Vidhan Sabha Constituency in Haryana. She entered politics as a District President from Rewari in Haryana state in 1995, and won first State Assembly Election as a Congressman in year 2000 from Salhawas constituency. She has been Consecutively winning Elections from year 2000 and serving 3rd tenure to the people.

Anita Yadav contested elections from Ateli constituency in year 2009 and scored a hat-trick in Ahirwal Belt despite tough competition from her rivals. She also served as the Minister of State as a Chief Parliamentary Secretary (CPS).

Early life 
Yadav was born to Umrao Singh on 20 April 1964 in Kanwali Haryana state's Rewari district. She completed her Graduation in Bachelor's of Arts (B.A) from Rewari and later pursued D. Pharma. i.e. a two-year Diploma in pharmacy from Board of Examining Authority, Bangalore (Karnataka).

Political career 
She has held the following positions:
 Member, A.I.C.C since year 2000
 Vice-president, District Council, Rewari
 District. President, Congress (I) 1995–2000
 General Secretary, All India Mahila Congress, 1997-2000
 President, Haryana Mahila Congress, 2000–2004
 SAARC Conference: All India Congress Committee Conventions (Adhiweshan) from the year 1995 to 2005
 Minister Of State: Chief Parliamentary Secretary

Personal life 
Mrs Anita Yadav married Dr Omkar Yadav from Gurgaon and they have two children.

References

External links 
Haryana Vidhan Sabha MLA
Haryana Polls 2014

1964 births
Living people
Indian National Congress politicians from Haryana
Haryana MLAs 2009–2014
Haryana MLAs 2000–2005